Patricia O'Connor may refer to:

 Patricia O'Connor (camogie), camogie player who played in 1949 All-Ireland Senior Camogie Championship
 Patricia O'Connor (educator) (born 1940), founder of Fashion Careers College, San Diego, California
 Patricia O'Connor (elder) (born 1928), Australian Aboriginal elder
 Patricia O'Connor (soccer) (born 1941), Australian soccer player
 Patricia O'Connor (nurse), Canadian nurse who organised medical evacuations with Adlair Aviation
 Patricia O'Connor (playwright) (1905–1983), Irish playwright, novelist and teacher
 Patricia O'Connor (veterinarian) (1914–2003), American veterinarian
 Patricia O'Connor, murdered Irishwoman, see Murder of Patricia O'Connor

See also
Pat O'Connor (disambiguation)